Paul Jasper (born 1974) is an American former race car driver born in Dayton, Ohio. He was the 1996 Rookie of the Year and finished 3rd overall in points as a Toyota Atlantic driver. In 1997 he signed to drive in CART for Dale Coyne Racing, driving the #34 Lola Ford-Cosworth. Coming off of a championship '96 season the '97 Lola was a very uncompetitive and flawed chassis. This resulted in bad timing for Jasper. He attempted six race, but failed to qualify for two, resulting in four race starts. Jasper's best finish was an 18th place in his final start, the Miller 200 at The Milwaukee Mile.

Career results

American Open-Wheel racing results

CART

External links 
CART statistics at ChampCarStats.com

1974 births
Atlantic Championship drivers
Champ Car drivers
Indy Lights drivers
Living people
Racing drivers from Dayton, Ohio

PacWest Racing drivers
Dale Coyne Racing drivers